Bailey is a town in Nash County, North Carolina, United States. It is part of the Rocky Mount, North Carolina Metropolitan Statistical Area. The population was 566 at the 2020 census.

History
The Morgan School was listed on the National Register of Historic Places in 2006.

Geography

Demographics

At the 2000 census there were 670 people, 274 households, and 184 families in the town. The population density was 955.8 people per square mile (369.6/km2). There were 302 housing units at an average density of 430.8 per square mile (166.6/km2).  The racial makeup of the town was 67.91% White, 22.84% African American, 7.46% from other races, and 1.79% from two or more races. Hispanic or Latino of any race were 10.75%.

Of the 274 households 26.3% had children under the age of 18 living with them, 52.6% were married couples living together, 10.9% had a female householder with no husband present, and 32.5% were non-families. 29.2% of households were one person and 13.5% were one person aged 65 or older. The average household size was 2.45 and the average family size was 2.98.

The age distribution was 23.6% under the age of 18, 9.3% from 18 to 24, 26.9% from 25 to 44, 22.2% from 45 to 64, and 18.1% 65 or older. The median age was 38 years. For every 100 females, there were 97.1 males. For every 100 females age 18 and over, there were 88.2 males.

The median household income was $36,328 and the median family income  was $43,750. Males had a median income of $33,929 versus $25,179 for females. The per capita income for the town was $21,910. About 6.7% of families and 11.2% of the population were below the poverty line, including 21.4% of those under age 18 and 7.9% of those age 65 or over.

Notable people
 Thomas Bradshaw, a Black man hunted down and murdered by a mob in 1927
 Jack Finch, conservationist of eastern bluebirds
 Julius Peppers, former defensive end for the NFL's Carolina Panthers
 Tarheel Slim, singer
 Zonovan Knight, running back for the NFL's New York Jets

References

Towns in North Carolina
Towns in Nash County, North Carolina
Rocky Mount metropolitan area